The No Sales Tax for Alcohol Question, also known as Question 1, was on the November 2, 2010 ballot in Massachusetts. The measure asked voters whether to repeal a sales tax on alcohol sales.  The ballot measure for the 2010 ballot was added after the Massachusetts State Legislature increased the sales tax in the state from 5% to 6.25% and eliminated an exemption for alcohol sold in liquor stores.  

The Measure passed with 52% of the vote thereby eliminating the sales tax on alcohol beginning January 1, 2011.

Text of measure

Summary
The summary of the measure reads:

This proposed law would remove the Massachusetts sales tax on alcoholic beverages and alcohol, where the sale of such beverages and alcohol or their importation into the state is already subject to a separate excise tax under state law. The proposed law would take effect on January 1, 2011.

A YES VOTE would remove the state sales tax on alcoholic beverages and alcohol where their sale or importation into the state is subject to an excise tax under state law.

A NO VOTE would make no change in the state sales tax on alcoholic beverages and alcohol.

Support

Arguments
 Liquor retailers in the state had argued that the 6.25 percent sales tax on alcohol is making sales decline, that more people are heading to New Hampshire to buy their alcohol, since that state is tax-free.  According to retailers, liquor sales in Massachusetts have declined from 10 to 40 percent in the past year.

Opposition

Opponents
 Senator Steven Tolman
 The Committee Against the Repeal of the Alcohol Tax 
 Massachusetts Hospital Association

Arguments
 Alcohol is not a necessity and does not deserve a special tax exemption. The only goods in Massachusetts exempt from the sales tax are necessities like food, clothing, and prescriptions. If anything should be taxed, products like cigarettes and alcohol should be.
 The tax has brought in $93 million in the current fiscal year that has helped fund the operations of recovery high schools

Financing
The following are major contributors in opposition to the measure:

Path to the ballot

The initiative's supporters believed their efforts cleared the signature gathering hurdle on November 18, 2009, gathering and submitting approximately 115,000 voter signatures Signatures were submitted to all local city and town clerks in the state. The initiative was reviewed by the Massachusetts Legislature. Since the Massachusetts Legislature did not approve of the initiative by the May 4, 2010 deadline, petition organizers had to obtain signatures from about 1/2 of 1% of voters who voted in the last governor election and submit them before or on July 7, 2010. According to the Massachusetts Secretary of State's office, that number amounted to 11,099 signatures. Sponsors turned in enough signatures for the ballot, therefore allowing voters to decide on the measure.

References

2010 Massachusetts ballot measures
Massachusetts statutes
Taxation in Massachusetts
Alcohol in the United States
Initiatives in the United States